Bachir Youcef Sehairi (born 21 June 1985) is the Algerian Secretary of State for Film Industry. He was appointed as secretary for state on 2 January 2020.

References 

Living people
21st-century Algerian politicians
Government ministers of Algeria
1985 births